The  was a class of four DC electric locomotives operated by the private railway operator Seibu Railway in Japan between 1969 and 1996.

Built in 1969 by Mitsubishi to haul 1,000-tonne cement trains, the design was based on the JNR Class EF65 and used bogies similar to those used on the JNR Class EF81 locomotives.

From 30 November 1990, the discontinuation of freight services to Sayamagaoka eliminated the need for double-heading, and the end of all Seibu freight services from 7 March 1996 saw the E851s become surplus to requirements. Final farewell Sayonara runs were organized in May 1996 hauling JR 12-series passengers coaches from Tokorozawa to Yokoze.

Locomotive E854 remains preserved at Yokoze Depot, but the other three locomotives in the class were cut up.

See also
 Seibu Class E31

References

 "西武鉄道 電気機関車小史２" (Short History of Seibu Electric Locomotives) by Fumio Gotō in January 2009 issue of Japan Railfan Magazine, p. 138-143

External links

 Seibu Railway website 

Electric locomotives of Japan
Bo-Bo-Bo locomotives
1500 V DC locomotives
Seibu Railway
Preserved electric locomotives
Railway locomotives introduced in 1969
1067 mm gauge locomotives of Japan